Hellinsia laciniata is a moth of the family Pterophoridae. It is found in Nepal.

The wingspan is 18–19 mm. The forewings and hindwings are bright yellow. Adults have been recorded from July to August.

References

Moths described in 1991
laciniata
Moths of Asia